The 2008 Acura Sports Car Challenge of Mid-Ohio was the sixth round of the 2008 American Le Mans Series season.  It took place at Mid-Ohio Sports Car Course, Ohio on July 19, 2008.

Race results
Class winners in bold.  Cars failing to complete 70% of winner's distance marked as Not Classified (NC).

Statistics
 Pole Position - #66 de Ferran Motorsports - 1:07.969
 Fastest Lap - #2 Audi Sport North America - 1:10.034

References

Mid-Ohio
Sports Car Challenge of Mid-Ohio
2008 in sports in Ohio